Bible John - A Forensic Meditation was a story written by Grant Morrison and appeared in  the anthology title Crisis #56-61 in 1991.

Publishing history
Bible John was an unidentified serial killer who killed in Glasgow in the late 1960s. Bible John - A Forensic Meditation is a study by Morrison into the nature of evil, as well as forming ideas as to why the killer committed his crimes.

The story was serialised in Crisis from issues #56-61 and has not been reprinted since.

Notes

References

Bible John at 2000 AD online

External links
 Crime Library story on Bible John

Crisis (Fleetway) comic strips
Works about serial killers